Jason C. Slater (March 8, 1971 – December 9, 2020) was an American record producer, songwriter and musician.

He is best known for being the co-founder, bassist and backup vocalist for the American rock band Third Eye Blind from 1993 to 1994. Following his departure from Third Eye Blind, Slater co-founded the rap rock band Brougham with Luke Oakson and the industrial rock band Snake River Conspiracy with Eric Valentine. He was also a member of two supergroups; "Band of Flakes" (with George Lynch), and Revenge of the Triads (with Charlie Clouser and Troy Van Leeuwen).

Outside of his work in bands, Slater produced several albums, most notably with the progressive metal band Queensrÿche, with who he produced five albums for between 2006 and 2013.

Biography 
Slater grew up in Palo Alto, California, where he helped form the bands Third Eye Blind, Brougham and Snake River Conspiracy.

In 1993, Slater founded the American rock band Third Eye Blind, and was the band's bassist and backup vocalist. However, he left the band after its first year after recording their first demo.

On December 9, 2020, Slater died from liver failure at a Maui, Hawaii hospital. He was 49 years old.

Discography 

Unreleased albums

References

External links 
 

1971 births
2020 deaths
Record producers from California
Place of birth missing
Musicians from Palo Alto, California
20th-century American bass guitarists
21st-century American bass guitarists
American male bass guitarists
20th-century American male musicians
21st-century American male musicians
Deaths from liver failure